Lenox Park may refer to:

Georgia
 Lenox Park (Atlanta), historic neighborhood now part of the Morningside-Lenox Park neighborhood
 Lenox Park (DeKalb County, Georgia), a neighborhood and business park near/in the Brookhaven area of DeKalb County; headquarters of AT&T Mobility

New York
 Lenox Park, New York

North Carolina
 a historic district in Hendersonville